Kahului Airport  is the main airport of Maui in the State of Hawaii, United States, located east of Kahului. It has offered full airport operations since 1952. Most flights into Kahului Airport originate from Daniel K. Inouye International Airport in Honolulu; the Honolulu–Kahului corridor is one of the heaviest-trafficked air routes in the US, ranking 13th in 2004 with 1,632,000 passengers.

The IATA airport code OGG pays homage to aviation pioneer Bertram J. "Jimmy" Hogg, a Kauai native and aviation pioneer who worked for what is now Hawaiian Airlines, flying aircraft ranging from eight-passenger Sikorsky S-38 amphibians to Douglas DC-3s and DC-9s into the late 1960s.

It is included in the Federal Aviation Administration (FAA) National Plan of Integrated Airport Systems for 2021–2025, in which it is categorized as a medium-hub primary commercial service facility.

History
Construction started on Naval Air Station Kahului in 1942. After the war, extensive negotiations between the Territory of Hawaii and the Navy resulted in the airbase being turned over to the Hawaii Aeronautics Commission. The Kahului Airport began commercial airline operations in June 1952.

Authority
Kahului Airport is part of a centralized state structure governing all of the airports and seaports of Hawaii.  The official authority of Kahului Airport is the Governor of Hawaii. The governor appoints the Director of the Hawaii State Department of Transportation, who has jurisdiction over the Hawaii Airports Administrator.

The Hawaii Airports Administrator oversees six governing bodies: Airports Operations Office, Airports Planning Office, Engineering Branch, Information Technology Office, Staff Services Office, and Visitor Information Program Office. Collectively, the six bodies have authority over the four airport districts in Hawaii: Hawai'i District, Kaua'i District, Maui District and the principal O'ahu District. Kahului Airport is a subordinate of Maui District officials.

Facilities and aircraft

The Kahului Airport terminal building has ticketing, USDA agricultural inspection, and baggage claim areas on the ground level.

Sixteen jetways are available for enplaning or deplaning passengers (there are six gate hold areas designated A–F).  Gates with odd numbers have jetway systems, while gates with even numbers are designated as emergency exits and have stairs that lead to the ramp below. The main passenger terminal is divided into two areas, north and south. The south area houses Gates 1–16 with seven aircraft parking positions (sized for four inter-island and three overseas aircraft). The north area houses Gates 17–39 with nine aircraft parking positions (sized for three inter-island and six overseas aircraft). Inter-island gates are Gates 9, 11, 13, 15, 17, 19, and 21. Overseas gates are Gates 1, 5, 7, 23, 27, 29, 33, 35, and 39.

Most of the gates were spaced to handle narrow-body aircraft like the DC-9 and Boeing 737 long used on inter-island flights. In 1982–83 Kahului started receiving nonstop flights from the United States mainland using much larger transoceanic aircraft. Today they include wide-body aircraft, like the Airbus A330, Boeing 767, and Boeing 777, and narrow-body craft like the Boeing 737-800. The smaller aircraft used on inter-island flights fit at all gates, while the larger overseas airliners cannot. Because of the size of the wide-body aircraft, Gates 3, 25, 31, and 37 are rarely used.

The airport is going through expansion authorized by the Hawaii State Legislature. A goal has been set to prepare Kahului Airport to eventually become a permanent international airport with service routes from Canada and Japan.  Current flights from Canada use United States border preclearance facilities in Vancouver, Calgary or Edmonton. Under the December 2016 Kahului Airport Master Plan Update, two more aircraft parking positions would be added to the thirteen existing for the main passenger terminal. The current thirteen positions are sized for three inter-island and ten overseas aircraft.

There is one lounge operated by Hawaiian Airlines, the Premier Club, located across from Gate 17.

Airfield

It also has an asphalt helipad designated H1 measuring 125 × 125 feet (38 × 38 m). Rotary-wing aircraft operate from the area directly east of the approach end of Runway 2. No fixed-wing aircraft are permitted in this area between sunrise and sunset, and fixed-wing operations in this area from sunset to sunrise require prior authorization.

Most commercial flights use Runway 2, which is equipped with a Category I Instrument Landing System. Runway 5 is primarily used for lighter commuter aircraft and general aviation. For noise abatement, flights taking off from Runway 2 are directed to climb straight ahead after takeoff until clear of the shoreline by  before making any turns. Flights landing on Runway 2 detour west of Kahului and Wailuku on a heading almost directly south before lining up for landing. Flights landing on Runway 5 follow the coastline and avoid overflying populated areas as much as possible.

This would enable nonstop service from Kahului to Chicago, Dallas, and Denver with Boeing 777-200 aircraft. The parallel runway would enable simultaneous operations and would serve as a backup to Runway 2. Runway 2 has been experiencing pavement distress since 2008, and reconstruction to a concrete surface (from the present grooved asphalt) is recommended.

Expansion
As a result of the passage of Hawaii State Legislature bills in 1998 and 2001, Kahului is planned to undergo expansion for new, larger facilities, lengthening of runways, increasing of fuel storage capacities, and construction of new access roads.  The controversial project has met opposition from residents who do not agree with the elevation of Kahului Airport to a permanent international airport. Project opponents cite concerns about increased introduction of invasive species and other issues, as evidenced by the common Maui bumper sticker "Big city airport, big city problems."

In early 2005, Governor Linda Lingle released $365 million for construction of an extended ticketing lobby, new baggage claim carousels, a new Alien Species building, a new cargo building, construction of a new apron, construction of an additional 10 jetways to replace the current jetways, and a new six-lane airport access road that would run from the airport, intersecting Haleakala Highway and Hana Highway, and run parallel to Dairy Road where it would merge with Puunene Avenue (highway 350), Dairy Road, and Kuihelani Highway (highway 380). Construction on the new Airport Access Road began in November 2013, and was completed in July 2016 at a cost of $56 million funded, from rental car facility charges.

A new consolidated rental car facility was opened at Kahului Airport on May 15, 2019. The LEED-certified facility features customer service counters, approximately 3,700 parking spaces for rental cars, and an electric tram running between the terminal and the rental car facility, eliminating the need for shuttle buses.

Airlines and destinations

Statistics

Passenger numbers

Top destinations

Airline market share

Public transport

Maui Bus operates two routes that stop at Kahului Airport. Route 35 Haiku Islander and Route 40 Upcountry Islander stop at the airport, both as a third stop from Queen Kaahumanu Center in Kahului, and third to last stop going back to Kahului. Route 35 connects the airport with Paia and Haiku, while Route 40 connects Pukalani, Makawao, and Haliimaile to the airport.

Accidents and incidents
Aloha Airlines Flight 243

On April 28, 1988, Aloha Airlines Flight 243, a Boeing 737-200 interisland flight from Hilo Airport to Honolulu International Airport carrying 89 passengers and six crew members,
experienced explosive decompression when an 18-foot section of the fuselage roof and sides were torn from the aircraft.  A flight attendant was sucked out of the aircraft and died.  Several passengers sustained life-threatening injuries including massive head wounds.  The aircraft declared an emergency and landed at Kahului Airport. Noise created by the rush of air rendered vocal communication useless, and the pilots had to use hand signals during landing.

Investigations of the disaster, headquartered at Honolulu International Airport, concluded that the accident was caused by metal fatigue. The disaster caused almost all major United States air carriers to retire their oldest aircraft models.

Aloha Island Air Flight 1712

On October 28, 1989, Aloha Island Air Flight 1712, a de Havilland Canada DHC-6 Twin Otter aircraft, collided with mountainous terrain near Halawa Valley, Molokai, while en route on a scheduled passenger flight from Kahului Airport to Molokai Airport in Hoolehua.

The NTSB determined the cause of the accident was the airplane's controlled flight into terrain as a result of the decision of the captain to continue the flight under visual flight rules at night into instrument meteorological conditions, which obscured rising mountainous terrain.

All 20 aboard the aircraft died.  Thirteen of the victims were from Molokai, including eight members of the Molokai High School boys' and girls' volleyball teams and two faculty members. The girls' team had just qualified on Maui for the state tournament.

Hawaii Air Ambulance

On March 8, 2006, a Hawaii Air Ambulance Cessna 414 was making an approach to Runway 5 when it crashed into a BMW dealership just a mile outside of the airport. A pilot and two paramedics were killed in the accident.

Hawaiian Airlines Flight 45

On April 20, 2014, a 15-year-old stowed away in a landing gear well of a Hawaiian Airlines jet flying from San Jose International Airport to Kahului Airport. Upon his arrival, he was spotted by authorities, who questioned him about the incident. The teen claimed that he was trying to get to Somalia to see his mother.

References

External links

 
 Kahului Airport (information)
 
 

Airports in Hawaii
Buildings and structures in Maui County, Hawaii
Transportation in Maui County, Hawaii
1952 establishments in Hawaii
Airports established in 1952